Monaco competed at the 2009 Mediterranean Games held in Pescara, Italy.

Rowing 
Men

Nations at the 2009 Mediterranean Games
2009
Mediterranean Games